Buck's fascia (deep fascia of the penis, Gallaudet's fascia or fascia of the penis) is a layer of deep fascia covering the three erectile bodies of the penis.

Structure 
Buck's fascia is continuous with the external spermatic fascia in the scrotum and the suspensory ligament of the penis.

On its ventral aspect, it splits to envelop corpus spongiosum in a separate compartment from the tunica albuginea and corporal bodies.

Variation 
Sources differ on its proximal extent. Some state that it is a continuation of the deep perineal fascia, whereas others state that it fuses with the tunica albuginea.

Function 
The deep dorsal vein of the penis, the cavernosal veins of the penis, and the para-arterial veins of the penis are inside Buck's fascia, but the superficial dorsal veins of the penis are in the superficial (dartos) fascia immediately under the skin.

History

Etymology 
The name Buck's fascia is named after Gurdon Buck, an American plastic surgeon.

Additional images

References

External links 
 
 Diagram (flash) at rnceus.com

Mammal male reproductive system
Human penis anatomy
Fascia